Gold bromide may refer to:

 Gold(III) bromide, a dark-red to black crystalline solid 
 Gold(I) bromide, a crystalline solid that may be formed from the elements or partial decomposition of gold(III) bromide